BauNetz Media is a German online platform offering services for architects, planners, and designers. The online magazine BauNetz is dedicated to daily news in international architecture. The magazine was started in 1996 and is located at Berlin Charlottenburg. BauNetz Media is part of the Paris-based group Infopro Digital. In 2018, Baunetz recorded a monthly average of more than 1 million visits and a good 10 million page impressions, according to IVW-audited data.

References

External links

Architecture magazines
Architecture websites
Visual arts magazines published in Germany
Magazines established in 1996
Magazines published in Berlin
Online magazines
1996 establishments in Germany
German-language magazines